Trademart Brussels is a 200,000m² wholesale trade center in Brussels, Belgium, located on the Heysel Plateau, housing showrooms which sells consumer products. The marketplace is closed to the public but open to certified retail buyers and interior designers, manufacturers and industry professionals. It is the largest purchasing center for retail professionals in Europe.

See also 
 Dallas Market Center

References

External links 
 https://www.trademart.be/en/

Buildings and structures in Brussels
Economy of Brussels
Year of establishment missing